Gobionellus is a genus of gobies native to fresh, marine and brackish waters along the Atlantic and Pacific coasts of the Americas.

Species
There are currently seven recognized species in this genus:
 Gobionellus daguae (C. H. Eigenmann, 1918) (Choco goby)
 Gobionellus liolepis (Meek & Hildebrand, 1928)
 Gobionellus microdon (C. H. Gilbert, 1892) (Estuary goby)
 Gobionellus munizi Vergara R., 1978
 Gobionellus occidentalis (Boulenger, 1909)
 Gobionellus oceanicus (Pallas, 1770) (Highfin goby)
 Gobionellus stomatus Starks, 1913

References

Gobionellinae